Pterocephalus is a genus of flowering plants in the family Caprifoliaceae of herbs and shrubs, comprising 25 species ranging from the Mediterranean, to central Asia, the Himalayas, western China, and tropical Africa.

From Greek πτερον, pteron, a wing, and κεφαλη, kephale, a head, in reference to the receptacle of the flowers being villous or chaffy.

Species
Pterocephalus arabicus
Pterocephalus bretschneideri
Pterocephalus brevis
Pterocephalus hookeri
Pterocephalus papposus
Pterocephalus perennis
Pterocephalus plumosus
Pterocephalus pulverulentus
Pterocephalus spathulatus
Pterocephalus dumetorum - Mountain scabious
Pterocephalus lasiospermus
Pterocephalus porphyranthus
Pterocephalus virens

References

Caprifoliaceae
Caprifoliaceae genera